Damsel is an upcoming American fantasy film directed by Juan Carlos Fresnadillo, written by Dan Mazeau, and starring Millie Bobby Brown, Nick Robinson, Angela Bassett, Robin Wright, Ray Winstone, Brooke Carter, and Shohreh Aghdashloo. It is set for release on Netflix on October 13, 2023.

Premise
A dutiful damsel agrees to marry a handsome prince, only to discover it was all a trap: The royal family recruited her as a sacrifice to repay an ancient debt. She’s then thrown into a cave with a fire-breathing dragon, relying solely on her wits and will to survive.

Cast
 Millie Bobby Brown as Princess Elodie
 Nick Robinson as Prince Henry 
 Angela Bassett as Lady Bayford, Elodie’s step mother
 Robin Wright as Queen Isabelle
 Ray Winstone as the King
 Brooke Carter 
 Shohreh Aghdashloo

Production
Damsel was announced in March 2020, with Juan Carlos Fresnadillo set as director, Joe Roth and Jeff Kirschenbaum set as producers, and the script written by Dan Mazeau. In November 2020, Millie Bobby Brown was cast as Princess Elodie, along with being an executive producer for the film, with a projected budget of $60-70 million set for the film.

The film started shooting in February 2022, and lasted until July 1, 2022, in Tomar, a municipality in the Santarém district of Portugal. In April 2022, Angela Bassett joined the cast, as did Nick Robinson, Robin Wright, Ray Winstone, Brooke Carter, Ricky Guillart, and Shohreh Aghdashloo.

Release
Damsel is scheduled to be released by Netflix on October 13, 2023.

References

External links
 

2023 fantasy films
2020s American films
2020s English-language films
American fantasy films
English-language Netflix original films
Films directed by Juan Carlos Fresnadillo
Films produced by Joe Roth
Films shot in Portugal
Films with screenplays by Dan Mazeau
Upcoming English-language films
Upcoming Netflix original films